Khudiram Bose is a 2022 Indian Telugu-language biographical film about Indian revolutionary leader Khudiram Bose The film stars Rakesh Jagarlamudi in the titular role, with production design, and stunts helmed by Thota Tharani, and  Kanal Kannan respectively. The film is featured in the Indian Panorama section of the 53rd International Film Festival of India.

Premise
The is film about Midnapur born Khudiram Bose's journey. The first youngest freedom fighter, who was hanged at the age of 18.

Cast
Rakesh Jagarlamudi as Khudiram Bose
Nassar as Bal Gangadhar Tilak
Atul Kulkarni as Barindra Kumar Ghosh
Vivek Oberoi as Narendra Kumar Basu

References

2022 films
2022 action drama films
2020s Telugu-language films
Indian action drama films
Indian historical action films
2020s historical action films
Films shot in Hyderabad, India
Films postponed due to the COVID-19 pandemic
Film productions suspended due to the COVID-19 pandemic
Alternate history films
Indian epic films
Films set in the Indian independence movement
2020s biographical films
Indian films based on actual events
Films set in the British Raj
Films set in 1908
Indian biographical films